Cluster of differentiation 40, CD40 is a type I transmembrane protein found on antigen-presenting cells and is required for their activation. The binding of CD154 (CD40L) on TH cells to CD40 activates antigen presenting cells and induces a variety of downstream effects. 

In addition it is expressed by various non- hematopoietic cells; activated CD4+ T cells primarily exhibit its ligand CD154, antigen-presenting cells including dendritic cells (DCs), B cells, macrophages, classical and non-classical monocytes, on a variety of non-immune cells including platelets and endothelial cells, and on several types of tumor cells.

Mutations affecting this gene are the cause of autosomal recessive hyper-IgM immunodeficiency.

Discovery 
Between the late 1970s and the mid-1980s, several immunology laboratories started began to use the new hybridoma technology to determine monoclonal antibodies (mAbs) and define receptors expressed at different stages of hematopoietic cell differentiation. The basis of the experiment was an attempt to produce mouse mAbs against differentiation antigens that could be used to describe the stages of lymphocyte differentiation and the various functional cell subsets. While doing the experiments method they used to make an mAbs is now called CD40 which is a surface receptor of B cells which is able to that can be polyclonally activated by a binding ligand. Furthermore, many features and purposes of the CD40 signaling pathway in B cells were made determined to the detection of CD40 ligand (CD154) which was determined as a T cell surface molecule which is capable of induction of contact dependent differentiation of B cells.

Function 
The protein receptor encoded by this gene is a member of the TNF-receptor superfamily. This receptor has been found to be essential in mediating a broad variety of immune and inflammatory responses including T cell-dependent immunoglobulin class switching, memory B cell development, and germinal center formation. AT-hook transcription factor AKNA is reported to coordinately regulate the expression of this receptor and its ligand, which may be important for homotypic cell interactions. The interaction of this receptor and its ligand is found to be necessary for amyloid-beta-induced microglial activation, and thus is thought to be an early event in Alzheimer disease pathogenesis. Two alternatively spliced transcript variants of this gene encoding distinct isoforms have been reported.

Specific effects on cells 
In the macrophage, the primary signal for activation is IFN-γ from Th1 type CD4 T cells. The secondary signal is CD40L (CD154) on the Th1 cell which binds CD40 on the macrophage cell surface. As a result, the macrophage expresses more CD40 and TNF receptors on its surface which helps increase the level of activation. The increase in activation results in the induction of potent microbicidal substances in the macrophage, including reactive oxygen species and nitric oxide, leading to the destruction of ingested microbe.

The B cell can present antigens to helper T cells. If an activated T cell recognizes the peptide presented by the B cell, the CD40L on the T cell binds to the B cell's CD40 receptor, causing B cell activation. The T cell also produces IL-2, which directly influences B cells. As a result of this net stimulation, the B cell can undergo division, antibody isotype switching, and differentiation to plasma cells. The end-result is a B cell that is able to mass-produce specific antibodies against an antigenic target.
Early evidence for these effects were that in CD40 or CD154 deficient mice, there is little class switching or germinal centre formation, and immune responses are severely inhibited.

The expression of CD40 is diverse. CD40 is constitutively expressed by antigen presenting cells, including dendritic cells, B cells and macrophages. It can also be expressed by endothelial cells, smooth muscle cells, fibroblasts and epithelial cells. Consistent with its widespread expression on normal cells, CD40 is also expressed on a wide range of tumor cells, including non-Hodgkin's and Hodgkin's lymphomas, myeloma and some carcinomas including nasopharynx, bladder, cervix, kidney and ovary. CD40 is also expressed on B cell precursors in the bone marrow, and there is some evidence that CD40-CD154 interactions may play a role in the control of B cell haematopoiesis.

Interactions 

CD40 (protein) has been shown to interact with TRAF2, TRAF3, TRAF6, TRAF5 and TTRAP. The remaining member of TRAF4 family, namely TRAF4, positively regulates CD40 signalling, but interacts with CD40 indirectly.

CD40 also interacts with CD40L, due to the role of CD40 in stimulating immune synapses when this interaction happens with CD40L activates dendritic cells to activate antigen specific T cells. This is occurs through the upregulation of major histocompatibility complex molecules increased expression of the co-stimulatory molecules CD86/CD80, and upregulation of TNF superfamily ligands on the dendritic cells surface, along with secretion of interleukin-12 (IL-12), which promotes CD8+ T cell activation. Moreover CD40/CD40L interactions provoke antitumor immune responses by increasing tumor cell immunogenic cell death (ICD), APC activation, tumor immunogenicity through upregulation of major histocompatibility complex (MHC) molecules,  proinflammatory factor production, co-stimulation of CD4+ and CD8+ T cells, and tumor cell susceptibility to T-cell lysis. In addition  the CD40/CD40LG axis is important for immune cell turnover and homeostasis under normal conditions. This is hypothesized because the closest association of cell proliferation is with CD40LG and the pro-apoptotic marker BAX also this axis plays a crucial role in promoting B cell activation and proliferation, the B-T cell immune synapses among with antigen presentation

CD40 as a drug target in cancer 
The CD40 molecule is a potential target for cancer immunotherapy. Anti-CD40  monoclonal antibodies may help prevent the killing of cancer cells by effector cells. Similarly, ligation of CD40 may lead to cell death in some tumor cells, as it is expressed in all lymphoid malignancies and in a number of carcinomas. There are a number of completed and ongoing clinical trials using agonistic anti-CD40 monoclonal antibodies to elicit an anti-tumor T-cell response via dendritic cell activation. Over the past 20 years, numerous human CD40  monoclonal antibodies have been developed and evaluated in clinical trials due to encouraging variability in cancer animal models. Agonistic anti CD -40-Abs are designed to mimic CD40L by cross-linking CD40 and in this way promoting the maturation of DCs and enhancing their antigen presentation ability. This leads to an increase in tumor antigen-specific cytotoxic T cells, which may result in tumor eradication. On the other hand, the preclinical efficacy has not yet been tested in the clinical setting, and none of these  monoclonal antibodies have progressed beyond early testing phases. Because of toxicity, the use of CD40  monoclonal antibodies has been limited to suboptimal doses, resulting in inadequate immune activation and antitumor activity. More recently, agonistic CD40 therapy has been shown to decrease T cell cytotoxicity in preclinical glioma models, and in fact affect the efficacy of immune checkpoint blockade. This is likely due to the high mutational burden most of these models display, which causes them to respond better to immune checkpoint blockade than human glioma, but is nonetheless relevant information for research in immunomodulatory therapies.

Hyper Ig-M Immunodeficiency and CD40 
Hyper-IgM syndrome is a primary immunodeficiency disorder characterized by decreased serum levels of immunoglobulin (Ig) M and elevated levels of IgG, IgA, and IgE. CD40 is involved in the development of hyper-IgM syndrome in that it serves as a co-stimulatory molecule in the activation and differentiation of B cells, which play a key role in producing immunoglobulins. In hyper-IgM syndrome, mutations in genes involved in CD40 signaling result in impaired B cell activation and differentiation, leading to decreased production of IgM and increased production of other immunoglobulins. As a result, individuals with hyper-IgM syndrome are susceptible to a wide range of infections and have an increased risk of autoimmune diseases and cancer. Currently, treatment for hyper-IgM syndrome involves the replacement of missing immunoglobulins, as well as other therapies to boost the immune system and prevent infections. Research is ongoing to better understand the role of CD40 in hyper-IgM syndrome and to develop new treatments for this disorder.

CD40 and Drug Development 
CD40 is a promising target for the development of drugs to treat a variety of diseases, including cancer, autoimmune diseases, and chronic inflammation. By targeting CD40, it is possible to modulate the immune response and enhance the ability of the body to fight against diseases. For example, drugs that block CD40 signaling have shown promise in treating autoimmune diseases, such as rheumatoid arthritis, by suppressing the overactive immune response. On the other hand, drugs that activate CD40 signaling have shown efficacy in treating cancer by boosting the immune response against tumor cells. CD40 also plays a role in the development of chronic inflammation, and targeting CD40 with drugs has the potential to treat diseases such as Crohn's disease and ulcerative colitis. Overall, CD40 represents a promising target for the development of drugs to treat a wide range of diseases.

References

External links 
 
 PDBe-KB provides an overview of all the structure information available in the PDB for Human Tumor necrosis factor receptor superfamily member 5 (CD40)

Further reading 

 
 
 
 
 
 
 
 
 
 
 
 

Clusters of differentiation